The 1977–78 Liga Nacional Segunda División de Baloncesto was the second tier of the 1977–78 Spanish basketball season.

Regular season

 3 pts deducted

References

External links
Hemeroteca El Mundo Deportivo

Segunda División de Baloncesto
Segunda
Second level Spanish basketball league seasons